Lake Osakis is a lake in Todd and Douglas counties in west-central Minnesota.  The town of Osakis is situated on the southwest shore of the lake.

Name
The lake received its English name by translation from the Ojibwe Ozaagi-zaaga'igan, meaning "the Sauk's Lake. The lake is supposed to have received its name due to a historical association with a small group of Sauks who, having been banished from their tribe for murder, made camp on the shores of Lake Osakis. According to Ojibwa oral tradition, these five Sauks were massacred by local Dakota Indians in the late 18th century.

Description
Gamefish present in the lake include black crappie, bluegill, largemouth bass, northern pike, pumpkinseed, smallmouth bass, walleye, and yellow perch. Osakis is an exceptional walleye lake; it has long been known as the "Mother Lake" because the Minnesota Department of Natural Resources uses a fishtrap on Bull Creek to obtain milt and eggs from walleyes for use in breeding and stocking programs. In addition to the above-mentioned gamefish, Lake Osakis has large populations of black bullhead, dogfish, brown bullhead, and tullibee, also known as "cisco." Some common carp are also present in the lake, however carp are an exotic species and their presence in the lake is not desirable. Osakis is the primary source of the Sauk River, having a naturally occurring but now human-controlled outflow on the east side of the lake.

References

Lakes of Douglas County, Minnesota
Lakes of Minnesota
Lakes of Todd County, Minnesota